The Pro Football Writers of America has annually honored an offensive player of the year in the National Football League since 1992. From 1992 through 2012, the award was presented in conjunction with Pro Football Weekly.

See also
 National Football League Offensive Player of the Year Award, overview of all NFL Offensive Player of the Year awards

References

National Football League trophies and awards